Silver azide is the chemical compound with the formula . It is a silver(I) salt of hydrazoic acid. It forms a colorless crystals. It is a well-known explosive.

Structure and chemistry
Silver azide can be prepared by treating an aqueous solution of silver nitrate with sodium azide. The silver azide precipitates as a white solid, leaving sodium nitrate in solution.

X-ray crystallography shows that  is a coordination polymer with square planar  coordinated by four azide ligands. Correspondingly, each end of each azide ligand is connected to a pair of  centers. The structure consists of two-dimensional  layers stacked one on top of the other, with weaker Ag–N bonds between layers. The coordination of  can alternatively be described as highly distorted 4 + 2 octahedral, the two more distant nitrogen atoms being part of the layers above and below.

In its most characteristic reaction, the solid decomposes explosively, releasing nitrogen gas:

The first step in this decomposition is the production of free electrons and azide radicals; thus the reaction rate is increased by the addition of semiconducting oxides. Pure silver azide explodes at 340 °C, but the presence of impurities lowers this down to 270 °C. This reaction has a lower activation energy and initial delay than the corresponding decomposition of lead azide.

Safety

, like most heavy metal azides, is a dangerous primary explosive. Decomposition can be triggered by exposure to ultraviolet light or by impact. Ceric ammonium nitrate  is used as an oxidising agent to destroy  in spills.

See also
Silver nitride

References

Silver compounds
Azides
Explosive chemicals